Richard L. Florida (born 1957) is an American urban studies theorist focusing on social and economic theory. He is a professor at the Rotman School of Management at the University of Toronto and a Distinguished Fellow at NYU's School of Professional Studies.

Florida taught at Carnegie Mellon University's Heinz College in Pittsburgh from 1987 to 2005, before moving to George Mason University's School of Public Policy, where he taught for two years. He was named a Senior Editor at The Atlantic in March 2011 after serving as a correspondent for TheAtlantic.com for a year.

Early life and education 
Florida was born in Newark, New Jersey. He graduated from Rutgers College in 1979 with a B.A. in political science. He then attended Columbia University, where he studied urban planning (M.Phil. in 1984 and Ph.D. in 1986).

Research and theories 
Florida's early work focused on innovation by manufacturers, including the continuous-improvement systems implemented by such automakers as Toyota.

Creative class
Florida is best known for his concept of the creative class and its implications for urban regeneration. This idea was expressed in Florida's best-selling books The Rise of the Creative Class (2002), Cities and the Creative Class, and The Flight of the Creative Class, and later published a book focusing on the issues surrounding urban renewal and talent migration, titled Who's Your City? 

Florida's theory asserts that metropolitan regions with high concentrations of technology workers, artists, musicians, lesbians and gay men, and a group he describes as "high bohemians", exhibit a higher level of economic development. Florida refers to these groups collectively as the "creative class." He posits that the creative class fosters an open, dynamic, personal and professional urban environment. This environment, in turn, attracts more creative people, as well as businesses and capital.  He suggests that attracting and retaining high-quality talent versus a singular focus on projects such as sports stadiums, iconic buildings, and shopping centers, would be a better primary use of a city's regeneration of resources for long-term prosperity. He has devised his own ranking systems that rate cities by a "Bohemian index," a "Gay index," a "diversity index" and similar criteria.

In 2004, following the rise of Google, the gurus of Web 2.0, and the call from business leaders (often seen in publications such as Business 2.0) for a more creative, as well as skilled, workforce, Florida asserted that the contemporary relevance of his research is easy to see.  One author characterizes him as an influence on radical centrist political thought.

Reception and criticism 

Florida's ideas have been criticized from a variety of political perspectives and by both academics and journalists. His theories have been criticized as being elitist, and his conclusions have been questioned. Researchers have also criticized Florida's work for its methodology. Terry Nichols Clark of the University of Chicago used Florida's own data to question the correlation between the presence of significant numbers of gay men in a city and the presence of high-technology knowledge industries.
Harvard economist Edward Glaeser analyzed Florida's data and concluded that educational levels, rather than the presence of bohemians or gay people, is correlated with metropolitan economic development. 
Other critics have said that the conditions it describes may no longer exist, and that his theories may be better suited to politics, rather than economics. Florida has gone on to directly reply to a number of these objections.

Some scholars have voiced concern over Florida's influence on urban planners throughout the United States. A 2010 book, Weird City, examines Florida's influence on planning policy in Austin, Texas. The main body of the book treats Florida's creative class theory in an introductory and neutral tone, but in a theoretical "postscript" chapter, the author criticizes what he describes as Florida's tendency to "whitewash" the negative externalities associated with creative city development.

Thomas Frank criticizes Florida's "creative class" formulation as one of "several flattering ways of describing the professional cohort," this particular one being "the most obsequious designation of them all." Frank places the creative class within a broader critique of the Democratic Party: "Let us be clear about the political views Florida was expounding here. The problem with, say, George W. Bush's administration was not that it favored the rich; it was that it favored the wrong rich—the 'old-economy' rich.... Florida wept for unfairly ignored industries, but he expressed little sympathy for the working people whose issues were now ignored by both parties."

Personal life 
Florida lives in Toronto and Miami and is married to Rana Florida.

Publications 
 The New Urban Crisis: How Our Cities Are Increasing Inequality, Deepening Segregation, and Failing the Middle Class—and What We Can Do About It, 2017. Basic. .
The Great Reset: How New Ways of Living and Working Drive Post-Crash Prosperity, 2010. New York: HarperCollins.
Who's Your City?, 2008. .
The Flight of the Creative Class. The New Global Competition for Talent, 2005. HarperBusiness, HarperCollins. .
 Cities and the Creative Class, 2005. Routledge. .
 The Rise of the Creative Class. And How It's Transforming Work, Leisure and Everyday Life, 2002. Basic. .
 Branscomb, Lewis & Kodama, Fumio & Florida, Richard (1999). Industrializing Knowledge: University-Industry Linkages in Japan and the United States. MIT Press. .
 Kenney, Martin & Florida, Richard (1993). Beyond Mass Production: The Japanese System and Its Transfer to the US. Oxford University Press. .
 Florida, Richard (1990). The Breakthrough Illusion. Corporate America's Failure to Move from Innovation to Mass Production. Basic.  .

References

External links 

 "How the Crash Will Reshape America" by Richard Florida, cover story The Atlantic Monthly, March 2009

Curriculum vitae original

1957 births
20th-century American economists
20th-century American male writers
21st-century American economists
21st-century American male writers
American expatriate academics
American expatriates in Canada
Carnegie Mellon University faculty
Columbia Graduate School of Architecture, Planning and Preservation alumni
George Mason University faculty
Living people
Radical centrist writers
Academic staff of the University of Toronto
Urban theorists
Writers from Newark, New Jersey